Walter Barnes may refer to:
 Walter Barnes (musician) (1905–1940), American jazz clarinetist, saxophonist and bandleader
 Walter Barnes (politician) (1858–1933) Queensland parliamentarian
 Walt Barnes (1918–1998), American football player and character actor
 Walt Barnes (defensive lineman) (born 1944), American football player
 Walley Barnes (1920–1975), Welsh footballer and broadcaster
 Walter Barnes (sportswriter) (died 1940), American baseball writer, Honor Rolls of Baseball inductee

See also
 Walter S. and Melissa E. Barnes House, Somerville, Massachusetts